The Greys River is a tributary of the Snake River, flowing through western Wyoming in the United States. The river eventually flows into the Snake River in the Snake River Canyon, joining it just east of Alpine. The Greys River is generally a rushing mountain stream that separates the high Wyoming Range (east) from the Salt River Range (west). It joins the Snake River just above the intersection of U.S. highways 89 and 26. Just a short distance downriver from the confluence of the two rivers, the Snake widens quickly and passes through Alpine and enters the Palisades Reservoir. The largest tributary of the Greys River is the Little Greys River. At Alpine, Wyoming, the Greys River measures 654 cubic feet per second average. With a 180 cuft/s min. and a 3,004 max.

In 1997, Greys River hosted the second round of the World Fly Fishing Championships.

Sources

See also
 Hoback River
 Salt River
 List of rivers in Wyoming

External links
Satellite photo of the area
Wyoming State Water Plan Homepage, Snake/Salt River Basins
Two photographs 

US EPA watershed info

Rivers of Wyoming
Tributaries of the Snake River
Rivers of Lincoln County, Wyoming